Tundian Station is a station on the Line 16 of the Beijing Subway. This station opened in December 2016.

This station will feature a 3-storey automatic park and ride system, thus becoming the first Beijing Subway station to equip an automatic parking system.

Station layout 
The station has an underground island platform.

Exits 
There are 3 exits, lettered A, C, and D. Exit C is accessible.

Transport connections

Rail
Schedule as of December 2016:

References

External links 
Tundian station – Beijing MTR Corp.

Beijing Subway stations in Haidian District
Railway stations in China opened in 2016